Eleutherobia is a genus of soft corals in the family Alcyoniidae.

Species
Species in the genus include:
 Eleutherobia australiensis Bryce, Poliseno, Alderslade & Vargas, 2015
 Eleutherobia dofleini (Kükenthal, 1906)
 Eleutherobia duriuscula (Thomson & Dean, 1931)
 Eleutherobia flava (Nutting, 1912)
 Eleutherobia grandiflora (Kükenthal, 1906)
 Eleutherobia imaharai Bryce, Poliseno, Alderslade & Vargas, 2015
 Eleutherobia lutea Benayahu & Schleyer, 1995
 Eleutherobia rigida (Pütter, 1900)
 Eleutherobia rubra (Brundin, 1896)
 Eleutherobia somaliensis Verseveldt & Bayer, 1988
 Eleutherobia splendens (Thomson & Dean, 1931)
 Eleutherobia studeri (J.S. Thomson, 1910)
 Eleutherobia sumbawaensis Verseveldt & Bayer, 1988
 Eleutherobia unicolor (Kükenthal, 1906)
 Eleutherobia variabile (Thomson, 1921)
 Eleutherobia vinadigitaria Williams & Little, 2001

 synonyms
 Eleutherobia aurea Benayahu & Schleyer, 1995, accepted as Parasphaerasclera aurea (Benayahu & Schleyer, 1995)

References

Alcyoniidae
Octocorallia genera